Secondo Magni (24 March 1912 – 17 August 1997) was an Italian racing cyclist. He won stage 14 of the 1939 Giro d'Italia.

References

External links
 

1912 births
1997 deaths
People from Fucecchio
Italian male cyclists
Italian Giro d'Italia stage winners
Sportspeople from the Metropolitan City of Florence
Cyclists from Tuscany